Sefid Kuh (also Romanized as Sefīd Kūh) is a village in Narestan Rural District, Aqda District, Ardakan County, Yazd Province, Iran. At the 2006 census, its population was 26, in eight families.

References 

Populated places in Ardakan County